Crime in Armenia is multi-dimensional. It includes murder, tax evasion, corruption, extortion, money laundering, police brutality, organized crime, and clan or gang violence.

In 2017, there were 20,284 criminal cases registered in Armenia, up from 18,764 in 2016. In 2018, 22,551 cases were recorded, 11.2% more than in 2017.

In 2018, Armenia had been classified as one of the safest countries in the world for travelers. The United States Department of State has classified Armenia as a safe country for tourists, giving Armenia the highest safety rating in the Caucasus region.

Crime by type

Murder 

In 2012, Armenia had a murder rate of 1.8 per 100,000 population. There were a total of 54 murders in Armenia in 2012.

In 2017, there were 49 cases of murder in Armenia (about 1.6 per 100,000 population), down from 66 in 2016.  A total of 409 persons died because of various criminal cases (down from 424 in 2016), including 202 cases of death because of crime leading to road accidents.

In 2018, with 38 cases, Armenia recorded the lowest murder rate in 38–40 years.

Organized crime  
Organized crime permeates the Armenian economy. In Yerevan, there are organized, criminal clans known as "akhperutyuns" (or brotherhoods). They assert their power through their position and connections. The various factions sometimes battle for rights over their "turf". Members are guided by the underworld laws brought from Russian prisons.

Corruption 

In 2017, 634 corruption related criminal cases were registered, which led to criminal prosecutions of 376 persons.

The United Nations Development Programme in Armenia views corruption in Armenia as "a serious challenge to its development".

Domestic violence 
A 2008 study by Amnesty International stated that more than a quarter of women in Armenia "have faced physical violence at the hands of husbands or other family members."  Since reporting domestic violence is heavily stigmatized in Armenian society, many of these women have no choice but to remain in abusive situations.

In January 2018, Armenia signed the Council of Europe Convention on Preventing and Combating Violence Against Women and Domestic Violence. Armenia has also signed the Convention on the Elimination of All Forms of Discrimination Against Women.

Environmental protection 
In 2017, there were 885 cases of breaches of legislation on environmental protection, leading to total 3346 million AMD compensation demands.

In 2018, the Government of Armenia and the European Union launched a joint action plan to develop and implement policies which will ensure a high level of environmental protection in Armenia.

By location 
In 2017, there were 10219 criminal cases registered in Yerevan, representing about half of all 20284 criminal cases in Armenia.

See also 

 Armenian mafia
 Human rights in Armenia
 Judiciary of Armenia
 Legal system of Armenia

Notes